Major General Clayton Naa Boanubah Yaache is a Ghanaian military personnel and a former Chief of Army Staff of the Ghana Army. One of Ghana's finest Military officers. He served as Chief of Army Staff from February 2001 to June 2005. He also served as Ghana's Ambassador to Mali from 2005 to December 2008.

References 

Chiefs of Army Staff (Ghana)
Ghanaian military personnel